Bharathi Kannamma is a 1997 Indian film.

Bharathi Kannamma may also refer to:
 Bharathi Kannamma (2014 TV series)
 Bharathi Kannamma (2019 TV series)